"Amor" (English: "Love") is the first English-language single from Ricky Martin's greatest hits album, The Best of Ricky Martin (2001). Originally, the song was included on the 2000 album, Sound Loaded. The Best of Ricky Martin contains two remixes of "Amor," by Salaam Remi and Jonathan Peters.

"Amor" was released on November 26, 2001 in selected European countries.

The song reached number eighty-two in Switzerland in December 2001.

Formats and track listings
European CD single
"Amor" (Salaam Remi's Chameleon Remix) – 3:25  
"Amor" (Jonathan Peters' Remix) – 3:34

European CD and 12" maxi-single
"Amor" (Salaam Remi's Chameleon Remix) – 3:25  
"Amor" (Jonathan Peters' Remix) – 3:34  
"Amor" (Album Version) – 3:27  
"Megamix by Jonathan Peters" ("María/Livin' la Vida Loca/The Cup of Life/She Bangs") – 4:16

Charts

References

2001 singles
Ricky Martin songs
Songs written by Draco Rosa
2000 songs
Columbia Records singles
Song recordings produced by Emilio Estefan

th:มายเลิฟ (เพลงเซลีน ดิออน)